Double Seat is a Marathi movie directed by Sameer Vidwans, director of Time Please.  Released on 14 August 2015, it starred Ankush Choudhary and Mukta Barve.

Double Seat has received positive reviews with critics who are praising the performances of Ankush Choudhary and Mukta Barve.

Synopsis
Double Seat portrays the struggles of a recently married couple seeking to move out of their family home and buy an apartment. Born and raised in Metropolitan Mumbai, Amit works in the packing industry with his approach to life reinforced by his father, a horse trainer. Amit's wife, Manjiri, a native of the village of Roha, with a remarkable zest for life, is optimistic about working as an LIC agent[1] despite the difficulties of adjusting to city life.

Cast

 Ankush Choudhary as Amit Naik
 Mukta Barve as Manjiri Naik
 Vidyadhar Joshi as Amit's father
 Vandana Gupte as Amit's mother
 Sandeep Pathak as Traffic Policeman Amit's Friend
 Shivani Rangole as  Sapna Sharma ,Neighborhood of Amit & Manjiri
Jayant Savarkar as Ajoba (grandfather) of Chawl
 Pushkar Shrotri as Amit's Friend (Guest Appearance)
Asawari Joshi as Chakuli Mami (Guest Appearance)

Release
The movie was released in Maharashtra, Karnataka, Goa, Gujarat, Madhya Pradesh, and Delhi on 14 August 2015 with 3,000 shows daily with English subtitles. Essel Vision distributed the film.

The movie had its world television premiere on Zee Marathi 8 November 2015, for which the actors filmed a special promo shoot.

Soundtrack

Spruha Joshi, Kshitij Patwardhan, and Sameer Vidwans wrote lyrics for the film's soundtrack. Jasraj, Saurabh, and Hrishikesh composed the score.

Track listing

Reception
Pune Mirror, the Times of India, and the Maharashtra Times gave the film 4-star reviews.

Box Office

Awards
Double Seat received five awards at the Maharashtracha Favourite Kon 2015 award ceremony. Anandi Joshi and Jasraj Joshi won the Best Singer awards for "Kiti Sangaychay Mla" which also won the award for Best Song. The lead actors, Ankush Choudhary and Mukta Barve, won awards for Best Actor and Best Actress respectively.
Double Seat has been officially selected as the best Marathi film album of 2015 by Apple Music.

References

External links
 
Double Seat Songs Lyrics

2015 films
2010s Marathi-language films